NFL Central Division may refer to:

 AFC North, formerly AFC Central
 NFC North, formerly NFC Central